The 2015–16 Matador BBQs One-Day Cup was the 46th season of the official List A domestic cricket competition in Australia. It was played over a four-week period at the start of the domestic season to separate its schedule before the Sheffield Shield. The tournament was held in Sydney, with most matches broadcast live on free-to-air television on GEM. In the final, New South Wales, who won every round robin game except for one against Victoria, was successful over South Australia, who qualified for the final through a victory in an elimination final against Victoria.

Points table

RESULT POINTS:

 Win – 4
 Tie – 2 each
 No Result – 2 each
 Loss – 0
 Bonus Point – 1 (Run rate 1.25 times that of opposition.)
 Additional Bonus Point – 1 (Run rate twice that of opposition.)

Fixtures

Elimination Final

Final

References

External links
 Matador BBQs One-Day Cup 2015/16 on ESPN Cricinfo
 Matador BBQs One-Day Cup 2015/16 on Cricket.com.au

Matador BBQs One-Day Cup
Australian domestic limited-overs cricket tournament seasons
Matador BBQs One-Day Cup